Phra Khanong station is a BTS skytrain station on the Sukhumvit line between Khlong Toei and Watthana Districts, Bangkok, Thailand.  The station is located on Sukhumvit Road to the west of Phra Khanong and Sukhumvit 71 Road junction near Phra Khanong market.

See also
 Bangkok Skytrain
Phra Khanong District

BTS Skytrain stations
Railway stations opened in 1999
1999 establishments in Thailand